Anthene atewa, the Atewa ciliate blue, is a butterfly in the family Lycaenidae. It is found in eastern Ivory Coast and Ghana. The habitat consists of primary forests.

References

Butterflies described in 1998
Anthene